Bernard Moses (1846−1931) was professor of history and political science at the University of California.

Early life and education

Bernard Moses was born in 1846 in Burlington, Connecticut. He attended the University of Michigan and later the University of Heidelberg, where he earned a law degree.

Career

Moses began his career as a professor at Albion College. In 1875 he began teaching at the University of California in economics, history and jurisprudence.  He founded the Department of History and Political Science in 1883, and created the Department of Political Science in 1903.

Moses was known as an authority on the history of Spain and Latin America, and he traveled often to Mexico and South America.

In November 1894, Moses was elected president of the San Francisco Settlement Association, and in the following year, served as the first Head Resident of South Park Settlement in San Francisco.

Moses was a member of the U.S. Philippine Commission from 1900 to 1902, and subsequently took part in the Panamerican Scientific Congress in Chile and in the International Conference of American States in Argentina. He was minister plenipotentiary to Chile.

Legacy

Eshleman Hall at U.C. Berkeley, originally built in 1931, was renamed Moses Hall in 1965.  In 2023, Bernard Moses' name was removed from the building due to his racist and colonialist beliefs which were found in many of his writings.

Selected publications
 "Social Science at its Method", 1880, Berkeley Quarterly, v.1, p. 1
     "The Communism of Early Christianity", 1880, Berkeley Quarterly, v.1, p. 211
     "The Crown and Parliament in Sweden", 1880, Berkeley Quarterly, v.1, p. 268
     "Early Swedish Literature", 1881, Berkeley Quarterly, v.2, p. 12
     "About Swedish Literature in the Eighteenth Century", 1881, Berkeley Quarterly, v.2, p. 225
     "The Extension of the Curriculum", 1881, Berkeley Quarterly, v.2, p. 336
     Politics: An introduction to the study of comparative constitutional law with W.W. Crane, 1883 [1898 ed, av]
     Imperial Germany: a lecture, 1886
     Social Infelicities of Half-knowledge: an address, 1886
     Data of Mexico and United States' History, 1887
     "The Establishment of Municipal Government in San Francisco", 1889, JHU Studies
     The Federal Government of Switzerland: An essay on constitution, 1889
     "The Social Sciences as Aids in Teaching History", 1891, Addresses before the California Teachers' Association, p. 16
     "The Economic Condition of Spain in the Sixteenth Century", 1893, JPE (Sep), p. 513
     "The Economic Condition of Spain in the Sixteenth Century", 1894, Annual Report of AHA,
     "The Nature of Sociology" Journal of Political Economy, Vol. 3, No. 1 (Dec., 1894), pp. 24–38.
     The Railway Revolution in Mexico, 1895
     "Certain Tendencies in Political Economy", 1897, QJE (Jul), p. 372
     The Establishment of Spanish Rule in America: An introduction to the history and politics of Spanish America, 1898 [bk, av]
     "The Economic Situation in Japan", 1898, JPE (Mar), p. 168
     Democracy and Social Growth in America, 1898
     "The Recent War with Spain from a Historical Point of View", 1899, Univ Chron, p. 400
     "New Problems in the Study of Society", 1900, Univ Chron, p. 13
     "The Ethical Importance of Our New Problems", 1900, Univ Chron, p. 205
     "The Western experiment with personal independence", 1904–05, Univ Chron, p. 25
     "The Control of dependencies inhabited by the less developed races", 1904–05, Univ Chron,  p. 84
     "The Organisation of Public Instruction in the Philippines", 1905–06, Univ Chron, p. 93
     "Results of the War between Russia and Japan", 1905–06, Univ Chron, p. 118
     "Arbitration", 1906, Univ Chron, p. 259
     The Government of the United States, 1906
     South America on the Eve of Emancipation, 1908
     Spanish Dependencies in South America: an introduction to the history of their civilization, 1914, v.1, v.2 [av1, av2]
     Spain's Declining Power in South America, 1730-1806, 1919
     Spanish Colonial Literature in South America, 1922
     Spain Overseas, 1929

References

External links 
https://www.hetwebsite.net/het/profiles/moses.htm

1846 births
1931 deaths
University of California faculty
American historians
American political scientists